Concealed conduction is tissue stimulation without direct effect, but leading to a change in conduction characteristics.

A common example would be an interpolated PVC (a type of premature ventricular contraction) during normal sinus rhythm; the PVC does not cause an atrial contraction, because the retrograde impulse from the PVC does not completely penetrate the AV node. However, this AV node stimulation can cause a delay in subsequent AV conduction by modifying the AV node's subsequent conduction characteristics. Hence, the P-R interval after the PVC is longer than the baseline P-R interval.

Another variation on this concept is seen in atrial flutter. As a result of the rapid atrial rate, some of the atrial activity fails to get through the AV node in an antegrade direction but can alter the rate at which a subsequent atrial impulse is conducted. In this circumstance, an alteration in the F-wave to QRS relationship is seen.

See also
 Atrioventricular node
 Electrocardiogram

References

Cardiac electrophysiology
Medical signs